PECE is a technique of handling an implicit ordinary differential equation approximation formula by a prediction (P) step and a single correction (C) step. (The E's represent evaluations of the derivative function).

This technique is used in the MATLAB function ode113.

References

PECE